Diethylene glycol butyl ether (2-(2-Butoxyethoxy)ethanol) is an organic compound, one of several glycol ether solvents.  It is a colorless liquid with a low odour and high boiling point. It is mainly used as a solvent for paints and varnishes in the chemical industry, household detergents, brewing chemicals and textile processing.

Production and Use 
Diethylene glycol monobutyl ether (DEGBE) is produced by the reaction of ethylene oxide and n-butanol with an alkalic catalyst.

In pesticide products, DEGBE acts as an inert ingredient as a deactivator for formulation before the crop emerges from the soil and as a stabilizer. DEGBE is also a chemical intermediate for the synthesis of diethylene glycol monobutyl ether acetate, diethylene glycol dibutyl ether, and piperonyl acetate, and as a solvent in high baked enamels. Other applications of DEGBE are as a dispersant for vinyl chloride resins in organosols, a diluent for hydraulic brake fluids, and a mutual solvent for soap, oil, and water in household cleaners. The textile industry uses DEGBE as a wetting-out solution. DEGBE is also a solvent for nitrocellulose, oils, dyes, gums, soaps, and polymers. DEGBE is also used as coupling solvent in liquid cleaners, cutting fluids, and textile auxiliaries. In the printing industry, DEGBE applications include: solvent in lacquers, paints, and printing inks; high boiling point solvent to improve gloss and flow properties; and used as a solubilizer in mineral oil products.

References

Glycol ethers
Commodity chemicals
Chemical synthesis
Butyl compounds